Joseph Bolangi Egwanga Ediba Tasame (29 December 1937 – 1 July 2019) was a Democratic Republic of the Congo Roman Catholic bishop.

Bolangi Egwanga Ediba Tasame was born in the Democratic Republic of the Congo and was ordained to the priesthood in 1966. He served as bishop of the Roman Catholic Diocese of Budjala from 1974 until 2009.

Notes

1937 births
2019 deaths
21st-century Roman Catholic bishops in the Democratic Republic of the Congo
20th-century Roman Catholic bishops in the Democratic Republic of the Congo
Roman Catholic bishops of Budjala
21st-century Democratic Republic of the Congo people